Mapopa Chipeta is a former Malawian politician. Chipeta was foreign minister of his country from 1997-1999.

References

Year of birth missing (living people)
Living people
Malawian diplomats
Foreign Ministers of Malawi